1,1'-Carbonyldiimidazole (CDI) is an organic compound with the molecular formula (C3H3N2)2CO.  It is a white crystalline solid.  It is often used for the coupling of amino acids for peptide synthesis and as a reagent in organic synthesis.

Preparation
CDI can be prepared straightforwardly by the reaction of phosgene with four equivalents of imidazole under anhydrous conditions.  Removal of the side product, imidazolium chloride, and solvent results in the crystalline product in ~90% yield.

4 C3H4N2  +  C(O)Cl2  →   (C3H3N2)2CO  +  2 [C3H3N2H2]Cl
In this conversion, the imidazole serves both as the nucleophile and the base.  An alternative precursor 1-(trimethylsilyl)imidazole requires more preparative effort with the advantage that the coproduct trimethylsilyl chloride is volatile.

CDI hydrolyzes readily to give back imidazole:
(C3H3N2)2CO  +  H2O  →   2 C3H4N2  +  CO2
The purity of CDI can be determined by the amount of CO2 that is formed upon hydrolysis.

Use in synthesis
CDI is mainly employed to convert amines into amides, carbamates, ureas.  It can also be used to convert alcohols into esters.

Acid derivatives
The formation of amide is promoted by CDI.  Although the reactivity of CDI is less than acid chlorides, it is more easily handled and avoids the use of thionyl chloride in acid chloride formation, which can cause side reactions. An early application of this type of reaction was noted in the formation of peptide bonds (with CO2 formation as a driving force). The proposed mechanism for the reaction between a carboxylic acid and CDI is presented below. 

In the realm of peptide synthesis, this product may be treated with an amine such as that found on an amino acid to release the imidazole group and couple the peptides.  The side products, carbon dioxide and imidazole, are relatively innocuous.  Racemization of the amino acids also tends to be minimal, reflecting the mild reaction conditions.

CDI can also be used for esterification, although alcoholysis requires heat or the presence of a potent nucleophiles as sodium ethoxide, or other strong bases like NaH.  This reaction has generally good yield and wide scope, although forming the ester from tertiary alcohols when the acid reagent has a relatively acidic α-proton is troublesome, since C-C condensations can occur, though this itself may be a desirable reaction.  A similar reaction involving thiols and selenols can yield the corresponding esters.  The alcohol reaction can also be used to form glycosidic bonds.

Similarly, an acid can be used in the place of an alcohol to form the anhydride, although dicyclohexylcarbodiimide is a more typical reagent.  The equilibrium can be shifted in the favor of the anhydride by utilizing an acid in a 2:1 ratio that forms an insoluble salt with the imidazole.  Typical acids are trifluoro- and trichloroacetic acids.  Symmetric anhydrides can thus be formed by replacing this trifluoro- or trichloroacetyl group with the acid that was used to form the original reagent.

Another related reaction is the reaction of formic acid with CDI to form the formylized imidazole.  This reagent is a good formylating agent and can regenerate the unsubstituted imidazole (with formation of carbon monoxide) upon heating.

Yet another reaction involves the acylation of triphenylalkelynephosphoranes.
(C6H5)3P=CHR + R'-CO-Im → (C6H5)3P+-CHR-COR' + Im−(C6H5)3P+-CHR-COR' + (C6H5)3P=CHR → (C6H5)3P=CR-COR' + (C6H5)3P+-CH2R
These can undergo the Wittig reaction to form α,β unsaturated ketones or aldehydes.

The reagent can even undergo reaction with peroxide to form the peroxycarboxylic acid, which can react further to form diacyl peroxides.  The imidazole group is also reduced by LiAlH4 to form aldehydes from the carboxylic acid (rather than amines or alcohols).  The reagent can also be reacted with Grignard reagents to form ketones.

A C-C acylation reaction can occur with a malonic ester-type compound, in the following scheme useful for syntheses of macrolide antibiotics.

Other reactions
The N-phenylimino derivative of CDI can be formed in a Wittig-like reaction with triphenylphosphine phenylimide.

OCIm2  +  Ph3P=NPh   →  PhN=CIm2  +  Ph3PO

CDI can act as a carbonyl equivalent in the formation of tetronic acids or pulvinones from hydroxyketones and diketones in basic conditions.

An alcohol treated with at least 3 equivalents of an activated halide (such as allyl bromide or iodomethane) and CDI yields the corresponding halide with good yield.  Bromination and iodination work best, though this reaction does not preserve the stereochemistry of the alcohol. In a similar context, CDI is often used in dehydration reactions.

As CDI is an equivalent of phosgene, it can be used in similar reaction, however, with increased selectivity: it allows the synthesis of asymmetric bis alkyl carbonates

See also
 Thiocarbonyldiimidazole (TCDI) the  thiourea analogue

References

Reagents for organic chemistry
Imidazoles